San Anton School is a private co-educational school located in Imselliet, near Mġarr, Malta. 
The school was founded in 1988 in the village of Attard, close to the President's San Anton Palace, giving the school its name.

Headmaster
The current acting principal is Bernardette Stivala following the death of headmaster Sandro Spiteri. He was appointed as headmaster in June 2020, and died in December 2021.

External links
 San Anton School Website

References

Schools in Malta
Educational institutions established in 1988
Mġarr
1988 establishments in Malta